Alpheus Muheua ( 1956 – 16 February 2022) was a Namibian politician who served as a deputy minister of Labour and Social Welfare.

Career 
A member of SWAPO, Muheua was elected to the National Assembly of Namibia in the 2009 general election. 

He was subsequently appointed to the position of Deputy Minister of Labour and Social Welfare in Pohamba's second cabinet. 

On 1 May 2010, Muheua applauded Namibia's 2008 Labour law, part of which was declared unconstitutional by the Supreme Court of Namibia in 2008.

Muheua died after a long illness in Swakopmund, on 16 February 2022, at the age of 65.

References 

1950s births
2022 deaths
Year of birth uncertain
Government ministers of Namibia
Members of the National Assembly (Namibia)
SWAPO politicians